George Washington Littlehales, born in Pottsville, Pennsylvania, 14 October 1860, graduated from the United States Naval Academy 9 June 1883. He resigned from the Navy 2 years later to join the Hydrographic Office. An eminent mathematician, oceanographer, and civil engineer, Littlehales compiled many publications in navigation, terrestrial magnetism, and oceanography. He served as chairman of the Section of Physical Oceanography, American Geophysical Union, and as vice president of the Section of Oceanography, International Union of Geodesy and Geophysics. He was a member of the Washington Academy of Science, the Philosophical Society of Washington, and the American Society of Naval Engineers. From 1919 until retirement, Littlehales ably represented the United States at numerous hydrographic congresses and councils throughout the world. Littlehales died 12 August 1943 at Washington, D.C.

Namesakes
Three U.S. Navy hydrographic survey ships have been named in his honor. The most recent was USNS Littlehales (T-AGS-52) serving 1992-2003 before being transferred to the National Oceanic and Atmospheric Administration (NOAA) and renamed.

References

External links
 

1860 births
1943 deaths
United States Navy officers
United States Naval Academy alumni
People from Pottsville, Pennsylvania
Military personnel from Pennsylvania